The Man from U.N.C.L.E. is a 2015 spy film directed by Guy Ritchie and written by Ritchie and Lionel Wigram. It is based on the 1964 MGM television series of the same name, which was created by Norman Felton and Sam Rolfe. The film stars Henry Cavill, Armie Hammer, Alicia Vikander, Elizabeth Debicki, and Hugh Grant. The film was produced by RatPac-Dune Entertainment, and Davis Entertainment, while Turner Entertainment Co., the original TV series current holder, was also involved.

In 1993, John Davis obtained the rights for a film adaptation based on the original series. However, the film fell into development limbo due to multiple script rewrites. Over the years, Matthew Vaughn, David Dobkin, and Steven Soderbergh were optioned for directing until Ritchie signed on in March 2013. The film premiered at Barcelona on August 2, 2015 and was released on August 14, 2015, by Warner Bros. It received mixed reviews from critics and was a box office bomb, grossing only $107 million worldwide on a $75–84 million budget. Rolling Stone listed this movie 50th on the best action movies of all time.

Plot
In 1963, at the height of the Cold War, ex-United States Army sergeant and professional thief-turned-CIA-Agent Napoleon Solo extracts Gaby Teller, daughter of Dr. Udo Teller, a missing alleged Nazi scientist-turned United States collaborator at the end of World War II, from East Berlin, evading KGB Agent Illya Kuryakin. He later reports to his superior, Sanders, who reveals that Gaby's maternal uncle Rudi works in a shipping company owned by Alexander and Victoria Vinciguerra, a wealthy Nazi sympathizer couple who intend to use Teller to build their own private nuclear weapon and give it to crypto-Nazi elements. Due to the potentially world-ending nature of this crisis, the CIA and KGB have reluctantly teamed up, and Solo and Kuryakin are ordered to stop the Vinciguerras from succeeding, with both men secretly assigned to steal Udo Teller's research for their respective governments.

The trio travels to Rome, where Gaby and Kuryakin reluctantly pose as an engaged couple, and Solo pretends to be an antiquities dealer. Solo deduces they are being monitored and instructs Kuryakin not to defend himself from muggers so as to preserve this cover. Despite their hostilities towards each other, Kuryakin heeds his advice and does not react when his father's prized watch is stolen. Later, at an auto racing event promoted by the Vinciguerras, Solo and Gaby flirt with Victoria and Alexander to obtain information about Teller. Meanwhile, Kuryakin acquires evidence the Vinciguerras were recently exposed to radiation, indicating that their weapon is near completion.

Solo and Kuryakin begrudgingly join forces to break into a Vinciguerra shipping yard, in which they find traces of uranium. After accidentally setting off the alarm, they escape into the water but find their way blocked. During a scuffle with the guards, Kuryakin nearly drowns. Solo escapes but surprises himself by returning to save Kuryakin. Although a suspicious Victoria pursues them with her henchmen, Solo and Kuryakin manage to slip past into their own rooms undetected. Victoria and Solo spend the night together. The following day, Gaby meets with Rudi and Alexander to discuss a job, but unexpectedly betrays Kuryakin and Solo to them. Kuryakin escapes but Victoria drugs and captures Solo and takes him to a nearby warehouse. There, Rudi, who is revealed as an infamous Nazi war criminal, tortures Solo in an electric chair. Solo is rescued by Kuryakin, who tortures Rudi. Rudi reveals that the weapon is hidden in an island fortress where Gaby has been reunited with her father; while Solo and Kuryakin discuss what they should do with Rudi, the chair malfunctions and causes a fire which kills him. Solo and Kuryakin travel to the fortress.

To protect Gaby, Dr. Teller pretends to resume work on the weapon but intends to sabotage it. Victoria quickly sees through this deception, and has Alexander imprison Gaby as an incentive. Victoria kills Teller as soon as he has finished the weapon.

Meanwhile, Solo and Kuryakin are approached by Alexander Waverly, a high-ranking MI6 officer who reveals that Gaby is an undercover officer under his employment. He and members of the Special Boat Service help Solo and Kuryakin infiltrate the Vinciguerras's compound. While they search the compound, Solo finds Kuryakin's stolen watch on a guard. Alexander Vinciguerra then attempts to escape with Gaby and the warhead, but is intercepted and killed. Solo retrieves the disc with Teller's research, but realizes that the warhead Vinciguerra was taking with him was a non-nuclear secondary missile. Victoria has left undetected on another boat with the real warhead. Solo is able to contact Victoria via radio and keep her on the line long enough for Waverly to locate her and launch a homing missile, destroying the nuclear weapon and the boat, ostensibly taking Victoria with them.

Kuryakin is ordered by his commander to kill Solo and steal the disc. Furious at the order, but threatened with being sent to Siberia if he fails, a broken Kuryakin confronts Solo in his hotel room. When Solo produces Kuryakin's father's stolen watch, Kuryakin admits what his assignment was, only to have Solo reply that he knew this, and had the same orders. They instead share a drink on the terrace and burn the contents of the disc, so as to not give either of their countries the upper hand in the arms race. Reuniting with Gaby and Waverly, they are told that the trio has been reassigned to a new international organization under Waverly's command. Waverly gives them a new mission in Istanbul under a new codename: U.N.C.L.E.

Cast
 Henry Cavill as Napoleon Solo
 Armie Hammer as Illya Kuryakin
 Alicia Vikander as Gaby Teller
 Elizabeth Debicki as Victoria Vinciguerra
 Sylvester Groth as Uncle Rudi
 Christian Berkel as Udo Teller
 Luca Calvani as Alexander Vinciguerra
 Misha Kuznetsov as Oleg
 Jared Harris as Adrian Sanders 
 Hugh Grant as Alexander Waverly

Production

Development
Producer John Davis optioned the film rights to the 1960s TV series in 1993, setting up a development deal for an adaptation with Warner Bros. and series producer Norman Felton. Davis has estimated that he commissioned 12 or 14 different scripts over the course of 20 years, with writers Jim and John Thomas, John Requa, Glenn Ficarra, and Scott Z. Burns. Quentin Tarantino was briefly attached following the success of Pulp Fiction, but opted to make Jackie Brown instead. The Man from U.N.C.L.E. continued to labor in development hell with directors Matthew Vaughn and David Dobkin. Steven Soderbergh was attached to direct Scott Z. Burns' screenplay, with production slated to begin in March 2012. Executives from Warner Bros. wanted the budget to stay below $60 million, but Soderbergh felt that amount would not be adequate to fund the 1960s-era sets, props, and international settings required for the film. Emily Blunt was nearly cast as the female lead, but she left the project shortly after Soderbergh departed in November 2011.

Guy Ritchie signed on in March 2013. On July 31, 2013, it was announced that Ritchie's adaptation would start filming in September 2013 in London and Italy. The final production budget was approximately $75 million US.

Casting

In November 2010, George Clooney showed interest in the film, and was in talks for the lead role of Napoleon Solo, but he left in September 2011 due to a recurring back injury. After Clooney's departure, actors including Joseph Gordon-Levitt, Ryan Gosling, Channing Tatum, Alexander Skarsgård, Ewan McGregor, Robert Pattinson, Matt Damon, Christian Bale, Michael Fassbender, Bradley Cooper, Leonardo DiCaprio, Joel Kinnaman, Russell Crowe, Chris Pine, Ryan Reynolds, and Jon Hamm were considered for the lead role. On March 18, 2013, Tom Cruise was in early talks to take the lead in the film. Armie Hammer was cast in the second lead role as Illya Kuryakin on April 24, 2013, with Cruise set as Solo. Swedish actress Alicia Vikander joined the film on May 8, 2013, as the female lead. On May 23, 2013, Cruise dropped out of the film, due to his commitment to Mission: Impossible – Rogue Nation. British actor Henry Cavill replaced Cruise. Elizabeth Debicki was cast in a femme fatale role on July 31, 2013; Rose Byrne and Charlize Theron were earlier considered for the same part. On August 8, 2013, Hugh Grant joined the cast as Alexander Waverly, the head of United Network Command for Law and Enforcement (U.N.C.L.E). Jared Harris was cast as Sanders on September 4, 2013, and Luca Calvani was cast as a villain, Alexander. Simona Caparrini was also cast to play Contessa.

Filming
Principal photography on the film commenced on September 9, 2013. In October 2013, filming was being under way at the Old Royal Naval College in Greenwich, Royal Victoria Docks, London and Goodwood Motor Racing Circuit in West Sussex, UK.

Two locations stood in place for Berlin sites on either side of the wall: the public toilet fight between Solo and Kuryakin was shot in Regent's Park in London, while the car chase during the movie's first act was shot in Chatham Historic Dockyard, Kent UK.

Director Guy Ritchie finalized the script throughout production: "He's quite intuitive and tends to constantly rewrite stuff, which he does even when they're shooting. He'll rewrite things in the morning if they're shooting that day, working with the actors if something doesn't feel right." says long term collaborator David Allcock.

Music
The musical score for The Man from U.N.C.L.E. was composed by Daniel Pemberton. A soundtrack album was released by WaterTower Music on August 7, 2015. A behind the scenes video was also released. The musical score received many glowing reviews with the LA Times noting "it is composer Daniel Pemberton who in some ways seems to understand the idea of the movie even better than Ritchie, his score featuring breathy flutes, twangy guitar, spooky harpsichord and pounding drums and organ capturing the mixture of pastiche, homage and a twist of the new in a way the rest of the film rarely matches."

Release
The film was scheduled for a January 16, 2015 release, but on August 12, 2014, Warner Bros moved the film's release date from January 16, 2015 to August 14, 2015.

Home media
The Man from U.N.C.L.E. was released on DVD and Blu-ray on November 17, 2015 by Warner Home Video.

Reception

Box office
The Man from U.N.C.L.E. grossed $45.4 million in North America and $64.4 million in other territories for a worldwide total of $109.8 million, against a production budget of $75 million. The Hollywood Reporter estimated the film lost the studio at least $80 million, when factoring together all expenses and revenues.

The film grossed $900,000 from its early Thursday screenings and $4.8 million on its opening day. In its opening weekend, the film grossed $13.4 million, which was about $5 million below expectations, finishing third at the box office. In its second weekend it dropped 45% to $7.3 million, finishing fifth.

It opened in Russia with $3.1 million. In the United Kingdom, it opened alongside Sony Pictures' Pixels, earning $2.3 million, debuting at number 4 for Friday-to-Sunday, while Pixels was at No. 1 with $4.2 million, including previews during the week. Warner Bros did not preview The Man from U.N.C.L.E. Across Asia, it generated $2.7 million from six countries and $1.7 million in Australia.

Critical response

On Rotten Tomatoes, the film has an approval rating of 68% based on 291 reviews, with an average rating of 6.20/10. The site's critical consensus reads, "The Man from U.N.C.L.E. tries to distract from an unremarkable story with charismatic stars and fizzy set pieces, adding up to an uneven action thriller with just enough style to overcome its lack of substance." On Metacritic, the film has a weighted average score of 56 out of 100, based on 40 critics, indicating "mixed or average reviews". On CinemaScore, audiences gave the film an average grade of "B" on an A+ to F scale.

Accolades

Soundtrack
 "Compared to What" – performed by Roberta Flack
 "" – performed by Suzanne Doucet
 "" – performed by Rita Pavone
 "Cry to Me" – performed by Solomon Burke
 "Five Months, Two Weeks, Two Days" – performed by Louis Prima
 "" – written and conducted by Stelvio Cipriani
 "Banana Freak Out" – written and performed by George Guzman
 "Man From U.N.C.L.E." – Theme (Instrumental) – performed by Hugo Montenegro & His Orchestra
 "" – performed by Peppino Gagliardi
 "" – written by Ennio Morricone
 "Torture in D minor" – performed by Sergio Pizzorno
 "" – performed by Tom Zé
 "" – written and performed by Luigi Tenco
 "Take Care of Business" – performed by Nina Simone

Possible sequel
In April 2017, it was reported that Wigram was working on the script for a sequel at the suggestion of Hammer. Cavill stated that he would be excited to return for the sequel.

iOS / Android game version
A 3D action game based on the film titled Mission: Berlin was released on iOS and Android. It featured sneaking, shooting, and getting in and out of drivable vehicles in the style of open world games. The player can choose to play as Solo or Kuryakin. There was also a multiplayer death match. As of December 2018, the game has been removed from both marketplaces.

References

External links

 
 
 
 

2010s adventure films
2010s American films
2010s British films
2010s English-language films
2010s heist films
2010s spy comedy films
2015 action films
2015 black comedy films
2015 films
American action comedy films
American buddy action films
American chase films
American coming-of-age films
American heist films
American spy films
American vigilante films
British action comedy films
British buddy films
British chase films
British coming-of-age films
British heist films
British spy films
Cold War spy films
Davis Entertainment films
Dune Entertainment films
Films about intelligence agencies
Films about neo-Nazis
Films about nuclear war and weapons
Films about terrorism
Films about the Berlin Wall
Films about the Central Intelligence Agency
Films about the KGB
Films about the Secret Intelligence Service
Films based on television series
Films directed by Guy Ritchie
Films produced by John Davis
Films scored by Daniel Pemberton
Films set in 1963
Films set in Berlin
Films set in East Germany
Films set in Rome
Films set in the Mediterranean Sea
Films set on islands
Films shot at Pinewood Studios
Films shot in Italy
Films shot in Kent
Films shot in London
Films shot in West Sussex
Films with screenplays by Guy Ritchie
IMAX films
The Man from U.N.C.L.E.
Warner Bros. films